Aristide Félix Cohen (31 December 1831 – 17 February 1896) was a French dramatist and author.

He was made auditor of the Conseil d'État on 28 May 1855, and held this position until 1865. F. C. Burnand adapted from La flamboyante the comedy The Saucy Sally, first performed at the Opera House in Southport in 1890.

Publications

References
 

1831 births
1896 deaths
19th-century French dramatists and playwrights
19th-century French male writers
19th-century French Jews
French male dramatists and playwrights
Jewish dramatists and playwrights